Zafar Iqbal Manhas is an Indian writer, poet, social activist and a Pahari politician from Jammu and Kashmir.

Life
He was an MLC of the Shopian district of Kashmir division. He was a senior member of the Peoples Democratic Party until joining the Jammu and Kashmir Apni Party in March 2020 He is also vice-president of the Jammu and Kashmir Academy of Art, Culture and Languages. He is vocal about the plight of Kashmiris especially displaced Kashmiri Pandits.

References

Members of the Jammu and Kashmir Legislative Council
People from Jammu and Kashmir
Indian people
Dogra people
Living people
Indian Muslims
Jammu and Kashmir politicians
Poets from Jammu and Kashmir
Apni Party politicians
1957 births